Trust is a privately held company and a value-for-money-brand for digital lifestyle accessories which offers a wide range of products within the sub-brands Trust PC & Laptop, Trust Mobile, Trust Gaming and Trust Smart Home. Trust's products are sold in specialist stores, large retailers, electronics chains and online stores in over 50 countries. Trust has an annual turnover of €130 million and employs 220 people in branches in five countries.

History
This company was founded in 1981 in the Netherlands under the name Aashima Technology B.V. and its core business was importing computer accessories, game consoles and video games. From 1985, the company started producing its own products branded as Trust. The business grew and so did the company. In 1988, the first foreign branch offices were opened in Germany, England, Italy and France.
In 2003, Aashima Technology B.V. changed its name into Trust International B.V. in order to reinforce the Trust brand name internationally. Nowadays, Trust products can be found in more than 44 countries.

The organization
Trust International B.V. is structured in a way to have a balance between central and local activities. Its central headquarters in The Netherlands is a shared service center for IT services, Research & Development (products & concepts) and Corporate Marketing.

Sports sponsorship
Dutch F1 driver Jos Verstappen used his strong Dutch links to gain sponsorship for the Minardi F1 Team in 2003 when Trust became one of the team sponsors.
That sponsorship was moved to Jordan Grand Prix in 2004 when Verstappen was on the verge of a race seat with the team. Trust had a sponsorship agreement with Spyker F1 as the team started to bring in Dutch sponsorship.
Trust was the head sponsor of the Arden International team, which competes in the GP2 and GP2 Asia series, and previously in Formula 3000. Because of the sponsorship, the team has been dubbed Trust Team Arden.
Trust also sponsored Minardi Team USA in the 2007 Champ Car World Series for much of the season but ended their sponsorship at the end of the season after the team stopped competing at the end of the year due to the unification of Champ Car and Indycar.
Trust sponsored Red Bull Racing in 2009, both Sebastian Vettel and Mark Webber had the Trust name visible on the chin bar of their helmets.

Brands
Trust
Trust Urban
Trust Gaming
Trust Smart Home

See also
List of Dutch companies

References

External link

Electronics companies of the Netherlands
Computer peripheral companies
Videotelephony
Electronics companies established in 1983
Dutch brands